Arista Cotton Mill Complex, also known as Salem Cotton Manufacturing Company and Arista Cotton Mill (Fries Mill Complex) and Lentz Transfer & Storage Co., is a historic cotton mill complex located at Winston-Salem, Forsyth County, North Carolina.  The complex includes two buildings: a brick building built in 1836 by part of the Moravian congregation of Salem and the original home of the Salem Cotton Manufacturing Company, and the other is the original Arista Mill, built in 1880 by F. and H. Fries Cotton Arista Mills.  The 1836 Salem Cotton Mill is a three-story, brick building with a monitor roof.  The 1880 mill is a three-story brick building, 14 bays long, with bracketed eaves with timber supports.  A two-story roughly triangular brick building was added about 1900. The 1836 building has been converted to a hotel known as The Historic Brookstown Inn.

It was listed on the National Register of Historic Places in 1977.

References

External links

The Historic Brookstown Inn

Cotton mills in the United States
Historic American Engineering Record in North Carolina
Industrial buildings and structures on the National Register of Historic Places in North Carolina
Industrial buildings completed in 1836
Buildings and structures in Winston-Salem, North Carolina
National Register of Historic Places in Winston-Salem, North Carolina